The 1977 Scheldeprijs was the 64th edition of the Scheldeprijs cycle race and was held on 2 August 1977. The race was won by Marc Demeyer.

General classification

References

1977
1977 in road cycling
1977 in Belgian sport